This is a list of candidates of the 2010 South Australian state election.

Retiring MPs

Liberal
Graham Gunn MHA (Stuart)
Liz Penfold MHA (Flinders)
Robert Lawson MLC
Caroline Schaefer MLC

Labor
Lea Stevens MHA (Little Para)
Trish White MHA (Taylor)

Independent
Rory McEwen MHA (Mount Gambier)

House of Assembly
Sitting members are shown in bold text. Successful candidates are highlighted in the relevant colour. Where there is possible confusion, an asterisk (*) is also used.

Legislative Council
Sitting members are shown in bold text. Tickets that elected at least one MLC are highlighted in the relevant colour. Successful candidates are identified by an asterisk (*). Eleven of twenty-two seats were up for election. Labor were defending four seats. The Liberals were defending five seats. Family First and an ex-Democrat independent were defending one seat each.

Notes
 Dr Paul Collier died on 9 March 2010. His name remained on the ballot paper, and electors who cast a vote for him had their vote redirected to their next preference.

References

2010 elections in Australia
Candidates for South Australian state elections
2010s in South Australia